Consider the Consequences! It is the earliest known gamebook, and has 43 different endings.

The 146-page hardback was published by The Century Company in the United States, priced $1.50.

The book's central characters are Helen Rogers and her two male suitors, Jed Harringdale and Saunders Mead. The reader's first decision is which of the three characters' viewpoints to adopt.

The book was favorably reviewed, among others, in The Tampa Times, the Santa Ana Register (who called it "a freak book"), the Detroit Free Press, The San Francisco Examiner, and The Salt Lake Tribune.

On July 6, 2018 the book was read on air on KZSC radio in Santa Cruz, USA, by James Ryan, who has researched the book and its authors, and his wife Nina, with choices made by the station's listeners.

Notes

References

Further reading

External links 

 

1930 books
American romance novels
Collaborative novels
Gamebooks
The Century Company books